Seribu Bukit Stadium is home ground of Gayo Lues Regency football team, PSGL Gayo Lues.

Buildings and structures in Aceh